Moritz Wilhelm August Breidenbach (13 November 1796 – 2 April 1857) was a German jurist.

Life 
Breidenbach was born at Offenbach as a son of Wolf Breidenbach. After his secondary education at a gymnasium at Frankfurt, he studied law at the University of Heidelberg, from which he was graduated in 1817 as a Doctor of Law.

After a supplementary course at Göttingen, where he was listed as a Jewish law student he began the practise of law at Darmstadt in 1820. He converted to Protestantism at a time when many thousands of German Jews converted because they wanted to enter civil service.

In 1831 he became counselor of the treasury in the Ministry of the Interior of Hesse-Darmstadt, and in 1836 counselor of the cabinet, in which capacity he officiated as commissioner of the Hessian government in the Landtag. He became a member of the council of state in 1848, but was compelled to resign this office upon the outbreak of the Revolution. He was recalled, however, in 1849 as chief counselor for education, which position he held until his death.

Breidenbach died in Darmstadt.

Legacy 
According to the 1906 Jewish Encyclopedia:

References 

1796 births
1857 deaths
People from Offenbach am Main
19th-century German people
Jurists from Hesse
German Lutherans
Converts to Lutheranism from Judaism
18th-century German Jews
19th-century Lutherans